5G wireless power is a technology based on 5G standards that transfers wireless power. It adheres to technical standards set by the 3rd Generation Partnership Project, the International Telecommunication Union, and the Institute of Electrical and Electronics Engineers. It utilizes extremely high frequency radio waves with wavelengths from ten to one millimeters.

Radiation in this band is known as millimeter waves, or mmWaves.

Radio-frequency engineering is the field of study and discipline specialized in this type of wireless power transfer.

The Internet of things and robotic process automation are two key technology segments to benefit from 5G wireless power technology.

References 

5G (telecommunication)